Following is a list of justices of the Tennessee Supreme Court:

Territorial high court
The following judges were appointed by President George Washington while Tennessee remained a United States territory, the Southwest Territory.

State supreme court

References

External links
Justices of the Tennessee Supreme Court, Tennessee Supreme Court Historical Society
Tennessee Supreme Court Photos, 1926 to Present

Tennessee
Justices